Incognegro is an album by Ludacris.

Incognegro may also refer to:

 Incognegro (comics), a 2008 graphic novel by Mat Johnson and Warren Pleece
 Incognegro: A Memoir of Exile and Apartheid, a 2008 memoir by Frank B. Wilderson III

See also 
 Passing (racial identity)